The 1988 Central Michigan Chippewas football team represented Central Michigan University in the Mid-American Conference (MAC) during the 1988 NCAA Division I-A football season. In their 11th season under head coach Herb Deromedi, the Chippewas compiled a 7–4 record (5–3 against MAC opponents), finished in a tie for third place in the MAC standings, and outscored their opponents, 287 to 176. The team played its home games in Kelly/Shorts Stadium in Mount Pleasant, Michigan, with attendance of 86,177 in five home games.

The team's statistical leaders included quarterback Jeff Bender with 1,309 passing yards, tailback Donnie Riley with 1,128 rushing yards, and Mark Hopkins with 433 receiving yards. Bender received the MAC's Freshman of the Year award, and linebacker George Ricumstrict received the team's most valuable player award. Four Central Michigan players (offensive guard Chuck Pellegrini, tailback Donnie Riley, linebacker Mark Dennis, and defensive lineman Scott Alferink) received first-team All-MAC honors.

Schedule

References

Central Michigan
Central Michigan Chippewas football seasons
Central Michigan Chippewas football